Duquesne was a  74-gun ship of the line of the French Navy. She was captured by the British in 1803, and broken up in 1805.

French service
In 1793, under Captain  Vence, she escorted an important convoy to the Levant, and then escaped a watching Anglo-Spanish squadron.

In 1795, under Captain Allemand, she took part in the Battle of Cape Noli, and in the Battle of Hyères Islands.

From mid-1801, she was armed en flûte and used as a troop ship. On 22 November 1802, she departed Toulon, bound to Saint-Domingue under Commodore Quérangal, along with Guerrière and Duguay-Trouin.

Guerrière and Duguay-Trouin managed to escape, and Duquesne, separated from the squadron, attempted to flee in the night. She was discovered by Tartar and Vanguard the next afternoon, and after a short artillery duel, Duquesne, outnumbered by her opponents, struck her colours.

Fate
Duquesne was incorporated in the Royal Navy as HMS Duquesne. In 1804, she ran aground on the Morant Cays. She was refloated in 1805, and sailed to England to be broken up.

See also
 List of ships of the line of France

References
Notes

Bibliography

External links

 

Ships of the line of the French Navy
Téméraire-class ships of the line
1788 ships